Vrontou may refer to several places in Greece:

Ano Vrontou, a village in the Serres regional unit
Kato Vrontou, a village in the municipality of Kato Nevrokopi in the Drama regional unit
Vrontou, Pieria, a village in the municipality Dio-Olympos, Pieria
Vrontous, a mountain in the northeastern Serres regional unit